Bedwyn Church Lock is on the Kennet and Avon Canal at Great Bedwyn, Wiltshire, England.

The lock has a rise/fall of 7 ft 11 in (2.41 m).

It is a Grade II listed building.

References

See also

Locks on the Kennet and Avon Canal

Georgian architecture in Wiltshire
Grade II listed buildings in Wiltshire
Locks on the Kennet and Avon Canal
Canals in Wiltshire